Jucélio Ferreira Jorgino (born 14 November 1991), simply known as Jucélio, is a
São Toméan footballer who plays as a central midfielder for Northern Irish club Sofia Farmer and the São Tomé and Príncipe national team. He also holds Portuguese citizenship.

International career
Jucélio made his international debut on 4 June 2016, when he entered as an 81st-minute substitute in a loss Africa Cup of Nations qualifier against Cape Verde.

References

External links 
 
 
 

1991 births
Living people
São Tomé and Príncipe footballers
Association football midfielders
People from Água Grande District
São Tomé and Príncipe international footballers
São Tomé and Príncipe expatriate footballers
São Tomé and Príncipe expatriate sportspeople in Portugal
Expatriate footballers in Portugal
C.D. Tondela players
Sofia Farmer F.C. players